Sanya Phoenix International Airport  is an airport serving the city of Sanya in Hainan, the southernmost province of China.

Sanya Phoenix International Airport is a main airport hub and comprises close to ten thousand acres.

It is the second busiest airport in Hainan, the busiest being Haikou Meilan International Airport. However, it was the first airport in Hainan to launch transcontinental air service, when Transaero Airlines started operating non-stop to Sanya from Moscow as early as 2007. The service was discontinued after Transaero ceased operations in 2015. Since 2017, several Russian airlines including IrAero, Alrosa and Azur Air have begun operating from various Russian cities, fueling the growth of tourism from Russia in Hainan.

In 2017, it was the 20th busiest airport in China.

Airlines and destinations

Passenger

Cargo

Ground transportation connections
Sanya Phoenix Airport Railway Station of the Hainan Western Ring High-Speed Railway, opened on 30 December 2015, is located just north of the airport. Initially, it connects on the Sanya Railway Station on the Hainan Eastern Ring High-Speed Railway (10 km to the east), and provides frequent high-speed rail service to a number of points along Hainan's eastern coast.

With the construction of the rest of the Hainan Western Ring High-Speed Railway, from Sanya Phoenix Airport to Haikou, rail service from Sanya Station become available to stations on the island's west coast as well.

See also
List of airports in China
China's busiest airports by passenger traffic

References

External links

Official website

Airports in Hainan
Sanya